Hugh "Hughie" Morrow (9 July 1930 – 27 October 2020) was a footballer and manager from Northern Ireland.

He played in the Football League for West Bromwich Albion and Northampton Town, and in non-league football for Nuneaton Borough, Lockheed Leamington and Kettering Town.

Career honours

Honours as manager

Tamworth
Winner
1968-69 Birmingham Senior Cup

Managerial statistics

References

1930 births
2020 deaths
People from Larne
Association footballers from Northern Ireland
Association football wingers
Nuneaton Borough F.C. players
West Bromwich Albion F.C. players
Leamington F.C. players
Northampton Town F.C. players
Kettering Town F.C. players
English Football League players
Football managers from Northern Ireland
Tamworth F.C. managers
Sportspeople from County Antrim